Looking for Hortense is a 2012 French comedy-drama film directed by Pascal Bonitzer.

Premise 
Damien, Chinese civilization teacher, is instructed by his wife Iva to ask his father, The Council of State, to help to prevent the expulsion of a young woman of Serbian origin.

Cast 

 Jean-Pierre Bacri as Damien Hauer
 Kristin Scott Thomas as Iva Delusi
 Isabelle Carré as Aurore
 Claude Rich as Sébastien Hauer
 Jackie Berroyer as Lobatch
 Benoît Jacquot as Kevadian
 Agathe Bonitzer as Laetitia
 Philippe Duclos as Henri Hortense
 Marin Orcand Tourrès as Noé Hauer
 Joséphine Derenne as Blandine Hauer
 Arthur Igual as Antoine
 Jérôme Beaujour as Campuche
 Masahiro Kashiwagi as Satoshi
 Iliana Lolitch as Véra
 Francis Leplay as Marco
 Stanislas Stanic as Marek

Critical reception
The film received mixed reviews. , the film holds a 56% approval rating on review aggregator Rotten Tomatoes, based on 18 reviews with an average rating of 5.35/10.

Accolades

References

External links 

2012 films
French comedy-drama films
2012 comedy-drama films
Films directed by Pascal Bonitzer
2010s French films